Murthy Rajan (born 28 August 1944) is an Indian former cricketer. He played in 44 first-class matches for Bengal and Vidarbha between 1962/63 and 1975/76.

See also
 List of Bengal cricketers

References

External links
 

1944 births
Living people
Indian cricketers
Bengal cricketers
Vidarbha cricketers
Cricketers from Nagpur